Valerie Constien (born March 21, 1996) is an American athlete who specialises in the 3000m steeplechase.

Constien is from Vail, Colorado and a 2014 graduate of Battle Mountain High School. She attended the University of Colorado following high school in the hope of being an environmental engineer. Constein competes for the Tracksmith Amateur Support Program while being coached by Mark Wetmore and Heather Burroughs. In 2015, Constein ran at the IAAF World Cross Country Championships in Qingzhen, Guiyang finishing 62nd.

Constien finished third on 24 June 2021 in the 3000m steeplechase at the Olympic Trials in Eugene, Oregon behind Emma Coburn and Courtney Frerichs to secure her place at the delayed 2020 Summer Games. The race went to form as Constien was the United States’ third-fastest steeplechaser heading into the Olympic Trials with a personal best of 9:25. She also set a new personal best of 9:18.34 in the race.

References

External Links
Val Constien at the United States Olympic & Paralympic Committee

1996 births
Living people
American female steeplechase runners
Colorado Buffaloes women's track and field athletes
People from Vail, Colorado
Athletes (track and field) at the 2020 Summer Olympics
Olympic track and field athletes of the United States